The Rockingham, or Waterloo, Kiln in Swinton, South Yorkshire, England, is a pottery kiln dating from 1815. It formed part of the production centre for the Rockingham Pottery which, in the early 19th century, produced highly-decorative Rococo porcelain. The pottery failed in the mid-19th century, and the kiln is one of the few remaining elements of the Rockingham manufactory. It is a Grade II* listed building and forms part of the Rockingham Works Scheduled monument. The kiln is currently on the Historic England Heritage at Risk Register.

History

The original factory on the Swinton site produced simple earthenware pottery. The first recorded operator was a Joseph Flint, who in the 1740s was renting the site from the Marquess of Rockingham. A partnership with the Leeds Pottery failed and was dissolved by 1806. The subsequent owners, the Brameld family, built the Rockingham Kiln, and other structures on the site, in 1815. The date, the year of the Battle of Waterloo, led to the kiln's alternative name, the Waterloo Kiln. Despite the Brameld's investigations into the production of high-quality porcelain, the venture continued to be unsuccessful and the firm was extricated from a further bankruptcy in 1826 only by the intervention of William Fitzwilliam, 4th Earl Fitzwilliam, who had inherited the Wentworth Woodhouse estate from his uncle, the second Marquess of Rockingham. 

The Earl's patronage, permitting the use of the Rockingham name and family crest, together with providing direct financial support, saw the Rockingham Pottery develop into a major producer of elaborate rococo-style porcelain, which enjoyed royal endorsement at home and considerable sales abroad. The factory produced major pieces including a full desert service for William IV which took eight years to complete. Ruth Harman, in her 2017 revised volume, Yorkshire West Riding: Sheffield and the South, of the Pevsner Buildings of England series, notes that "perfection was their undoing" and by 1842 the Rockingham firm was again bankrupt and the site was closed.

The Pottery Ponds site is administered by Rotherham Museums. As at November 2022, the kiln is on Historic England's Heritage at Risk Register. Recent interest in the Rockingham Works has seen the erection of a commemorative sculpture in Swinton in 2003, and a community heritage project at the site in 2021, directed by the artist Carlos Cortes.

Architecture and description
The Rockingham Kiln is believed to be the only surviving such pottery kiln in Yorkshire, and one of the few remaining in England. Harman records that the structure is more accurately described as a "bottle-shaped brick oven [containing] a kiln". The kiln is a Grade II* listed building and forms part of the Rockingham Works Scheduled monument.

Notes

References

Sources
 

Grade II* listed buildings in South Yorkshire
Swinton, South Yorkshire
Buildings and structures in the Metropolitan Borough of Rotherham
British porcelain
English pottery
Ceramics manufacturers of England
Structures on the Heritage at Risk register
Kilns